Adiheterothripidae is a family of thrips belonging to the order Thysanoptera.

Genera:
 Exitelothrips Strassen, 1973
 Neocomothrips Strassen, 1973
 Progonothrips Strassen, 1973
 Rhetinothrips Strassen, 1973
 Scaphothrips Strassen, 1973
 Scudderothrips Strassen, 1973

References

Thrips